The 1898–99 international cricket season was from September 1898 to April 1899.

Season overview

February

England in South Africa

References

International cricket competitions by season
1898 in cricket
1899 in cricket